"" (German for "The Trout"), Op. 32,  550. is a lied, or song, composed in early 1817 for solo voice and piano with music by the Austrian composer Franz Schubert (1797–1828). The full poem tells the story of a trout being caught by a fisherman, but in its final stanza reveals its purpose as a moral piece warning young women to guard against young men. When Schubert set the poem to music, he removed the last verse, which contained the moral, changing the song's focus and enabling it to be sung by male or female singers. Schubert produced six subsequent copies of the work, all with minor variations.

Schubert wrote "" in the single key of D-flat major with a varied (or modified) strophic form. The first two verses have the same structure but change for the final verse to give a musical impression of the trout being caught. In the Deutsch catalogue of Schubert's works it is number 550, or D. 550. The musicologist Marjorie Wing Hirsch describes its type in the Schubert lieder as a "lyrical song with admixtures of dramatic traits".

The song was popular with contemporary audiences, which led to Schubert being commissioned to write a piece of chamber music based on the song. This commission resulted in the Trout Quintet (D. 667), in which a set of variations of "" are present in the fourth movement.

Context

The lyrics of the lied are from a poem by Christian Friedrich Daniel Schubart. Opinion is divided on his abilities: The Musical Times considers him to be "one of the feeblest poets" whose work was used by Schubert, and comments that he "was content with versifying pretty ideas", while the singer and author Dietrich Fischer-Dieskau considered Schubart to be "a very talented poet, musician and orator". Schubart wrote "" in 1782, while imprisoned in the fortress of Hohenasperg; he was a prisoner there from 1777 to 1787 for insulting the mistress of Charles Eugene, Duke of Württemberg. The poem was published in the Schwäbischer Musenalmanach of 1783, consisting of four stanzas.

The Schubert scholar John Reed thought the poem to be "sentimental" and "feeble", with the final stanza of the poem consisting of a "smug moral" that "pointedly advises young girls to be on their guard against young men with rods". The academic Thomas Kramer observes that "" is "somewhat unusual with its mock-naive pretense of being about a bona fide fish", whereas he describes it as "a sexual parable". Fischer-Dieskau saw the poem as "didactic ... with its Baroque moral". Schubert did not set this final stanza, however, and instead concentrated on a person's observation of the trout and the reaction to its being caught by a fisherman.

Creation

In 1815 Schubert wrote a series of twenty songs based on the works of Ludwig Gotthard Kosegarten (1758–1818). Among them was "" (D 229), written in July that year; John Reed sees the song as a forerunner to "", observing that "" and other similar songs, "convey an intensity of feeling that belies their small scale". From the following year to 1821 Schubert composed four songs using the poems of Schubart, "" (D518), "" (D342), "" (D550) and "" (D454). Although the first draft of "" was lost and the exact date of composition is unknown, the lied is known to have been written in early 1817, the same year he composed "Der Tod und das Mädchen" and "An die Musik".

After Schubert completed the song, one of his friends, Johann Leopold Ebner, recounted that Schubert was told that "" unconsciously quoted Beethoven's Coriolan Overture; on hearing the comparison, Schubert decided to destroy the manuscript, but he was stopped by Ebner and others. On 9 December 1820 the song was published in a supplement to the Wiener Zeitung, along with a number of others of Schubert's lieder. He received no payment for publishing his songs, but was provided with free publicity.

Composition
"" is written for solo voice and piano in the key of D major. The song is written with a varied (or modified) strophic structure, meaning the "verse music" is generally the same, with one different verse. According to the American historian Mark Ringer, Schubert used a "musical structure that reflects both the life cycle of the earth and the progress from innocence to experience". Schubert directed the piece to be played "Etwas lebhaft", or at a "somewhat lively" pace.

The different verse is the third, and it demonstrates the "admixture of dramatic traits" in the lyrical song, which Fischer-Dieskau calls "a classic example of the strophic song with Abgesang ... 'after-strain'." The "after-strain" comes at the final stanza; the composer and Schubert scholar Brian Newbould observed that for three-quarters of the song's final stanza, Schubert departed from the strophe to give a musical impression of the trout being caught, but returned to the strophe for the final couplet. The primary rhythmic figure in the piano accompaniment suggests the movement of the fish in the water. When the fisherman catches the trout, the vocal line changes from major to minor, the piano figuration becomes darker and the flowing phrases are "broken by startled rests". According to Mark Ringer, the melody evokes a "folklike naïveté" that "delivers both delight and emotional power".

Schubart's poem takes the viewpoint of a male speaker, advising women to be careful of young men. By removing the stanza, Schubert removes the moral and creates uncertainty in the sex of the narrator.

Variations
After completing his original in 1817, Schubert made six subsequent autographs. These differing versions were not necessarily an attempt to improve a work, with some later versions being written from memory with only minor variations; Newbould considers that Schubert's close replication was a "feat of musicianship ... and a sign that Schubert spoke the language of music with the naturalness of conversation." The differences between the autographs are small: according to Reed, they "are concerned ... with the tempo indication and the prelude – postlude." The first version, marked Mässig, has no introduction, although "the shape of the familiar introduction is already adumbrated in a seven-bar postlude". The draft is undated, although is from 1817 and is kept in the Stadler, Ebner and Schindler collection in Lund. A second copy, written in May or June 1817, was for Franz Sales Kandler's album: this version was marked Nicht zu geschwind (not too fast).

A third variation was written during the night of 21 February 1818. Schubert and Anselm Hüttenbrenner, a friend and fellow composer, had finished a few bottles of Hungarian wine when Anselm commented that his brother Josef was an aficionado of Schubert's work. Schubert completed a copy of "" that was "somewhat messy". The messiness was partly accounted for by Schubert's drunken state, but also explained by the accompanying note he wrote to Josef: "Just as, in my haste, I was going to send the thing, I rather sleepily took up the ink-well and poured it calmly over it. What a disaster!" The manuscript was held by the Hüttenbrenner family for a number of years and was photographed in 1870, before being lost. Schubert wrote a further version in 1820 for publication in the Wiener Zeitung, and a final copy in October 1821 for publication in the Neue Ausgabe. The final version has "a five-bar piano prelude" and is presently in the Gertrude Clarke Whittall Foundation Collection of the Library of Congress.

In 1819 Sylvester Baumgartner—a music patron and amateur cellist in Steyr—commissioned Schubert to write a piece of chamber music based on ""; Schubert then wrote a quintet for piano and strings in which he quoted the song in a set of variations in the fourth movement. The piece later became known as the Trout Quintet (D. 667). Franz Liszt transcribed and paraphrased "" in two versions for solo piano. The first was in 1844 as the sixth part of his composition Sechs Melodien von Franz Schubert (S 563); the second transcription was in 1846 (S 564).

Reception

Information regarding the contemporary reception to "" is scant. Reed relates that the song had "immediate popularity", and that Schubert composing the Trout Quintet was evidence that "" "was already widely known" by 1819. Newbould agrees, pointing out that the quintet was "acknowledging the song's meteoric rise up early nineteenth-century Vienna's equivalent to the charts". Fischer-Dieskau takes a longer-term view of the song's popularity, writing that "the vividness of the imagery, with the alternate troubling and smoothing of the surface of the water along with the exuberance of the melody itself, account for the song's universal appeal".

In popular culture
The song is featured in the movie Sherlock Holmes: A Game of Shadows.

It is used  as a notification tone on some models of Samsung washing machines and dishwashers when the cycle is complete.

Notes and references
Notes

References

Bibliography

External links
 
 "Die Forelle" at Internet Archive
 Full score and MIDI file at Mutopia

Lieder composed by Franz Schubert
1817 songs
Art songs
Songs about fish
Compositions in D-flat major